The FIDE World Chess Championship 1999 was held at Caesars Palace on the Las Vegas Strip between 31 July and 28 August 1999. The championship was won by Russian Alexander Khalifman, making him the FIDE World Chess Champion.

Format
The format was a knockout tournament of short matches. This was similar in style to that used at the FIDE World Chess Championship 1998, and had the same advantages and disadvantages – see FIDE World Chess Championship 1998#Controversies.

A change from the 1998 championship was that incumbent champion (Anatoly Karpov) had no special privileges, other than that he (like a number of leading players) was seeded into the second round. In protest at this, Karpov refused to play.

Controversy and non-participants

In addition to Karpov, neither Garry Kasparov nor Viswanathan Anand took part. Kasparov, holder of a rival world championship title, refused to play in any of the FIDE knockout championships, and Anand was negotiating to play a match against Kasparov for his title. (This match never took place – see Classical World Chess Championship 2000).

Only three players in the top fifteen reached the quarterfinals and by the semifinals most of the favourites had been eliminated.  Kasparov called three of the quarterfinalists "tourists", perhaps intending only to reflect the surprising results of the earlier rounds, but the remark raised some controversy.

Winner Khalifman was rated 44th in the world at the time, which some compared unfavourably to PCA champion Kasparov being ranked No. 1. Khalifman said after the tournament, "Rating system works perfectly for players who play only in round robin closed events. I think most of them are overrated. Organizers invite same people over and over because they have the same rating and their rating stays high." Perhaps in response, Khalifman was invited to the next Linares chess tournament, and performed creditably (though placing below joint winner Kasparov).

Participants

 , 2751
 , 2726
 , 2723
 , 2720
 , 2716
 , 2714
 , 2713
 , 2710
 , 2700
 , 2697
 , 2694
 , 2691
 , 2684
 , 2681
 , 2679
 , 2677
 , 2673
 , 2670
 , 2670
 , 2667
 , 2665
 , 2662
 , 2659
 , 2658
 , 2652
 , 2650
 , 2650
 , 2649
 , 2648
 , 2643
 , 2640
 , 2634
 , 2627
 , 2624
 , 2620
 , 2616
 , 2610
 , 2609
 , 2609
 , 2609
 , 2609
 , 2607
 , 2606
 , 2601
 , 2597
 , 2594
 , 2593
 , 2593
 , 2589
 , 2586
 , 2577
 , 2576
 , 2574
 , 2569
 , 2565
 , 2565
 , 2564
 , 2564
 , 2563
 , 2563
 , 2561
 , 2559
 , 2558
 , 2557
 , 2554
 , 2553
 , 2551
 , 2547
 , 2545
 , 2543
 , 2541
 , 2538
 , 2537
 , 2536
 , 2535
 , 2530
 , 2530
 , 2529
 , 2528
 , 2527
 , 2523
 , 2517
 , 2515
 , 2515
 , 2511
 , 2505
 , 2502
 , 2500
 , 2487
 , 2478
 , 2477
 , 2458
 , 2454
 , 2423
 , 2400
 , 2389
 , 2387
 , 2368
 , 2330
 , 2330

1 Morozevich, Karpov, Z. Polgar, and Velimirovic had to be replaced with the following players:

2 Hakki and Bagheri did not appear due to the visa problems.

Results, rounds 1–4

Section 1

Section 2

Section 3

Section 4

Section 5

Section 6

Section 7

Section 8

Results, rounds 5–7

Championship final

{| class="wikitable" style="text-align:center"
|+FIDE World Chess Championship Final 1999
|-
! !! Rating !! 1 !! 2 !! 3 !! 4 !! 5 !! 6 !! Points
|-
| align=left |  || 2640
| 0 ||style="background:black; color:white"| ½ || 1 ||style="background:black; color:white"| 0 || ½ ||style="background:black; color:white"| ½ || 2½
|-
| align=left |  || 2616
|style="background:black; color:white"| 1 || ½ ||style="background:black; color:white"| 0 || 1 ||style="background:black; color:white"| ½ || ½ || 3½
|}

References

External links
Mark Weeks
USCF
Playjava

1999
1999 in American sports
1999 in chess
1999 in sports in Nevada
20th century in Las Vegas
International sports competitions hosted by the United States
Chess in the United States
Sports competitions in Las Vegas
July 1999 sports events in the United States
August 1999 sports events in the United States
Caesars Palace